The Lithuanian Lands Militia was a military unit of the Grand Duchy of Lithuania.

History 
The unit was stationed in Grodno.

Uniform 
The militia was dressed in a bright poppy red uniform with blue facings and gold buttons.

Commanders

Bibliography

Citations

References 

Grand Duchy of Lithuania

Military units and formations disestablished in 1794